The Journal of the International Association of Providers of AIDS Care is a bimonthly peer-reviewed medical journal that covers research on AIDS. The editor-in-chief is Jose M. Zuniga (International Association of Providers of AIDS Care). The journal was established in 2002 and is published by SAGE Publications.

Abstracting and indexing 
The journal is abstracted and indexed in:
 CAB Abstracts
 CINAHL
 EBSCO databases
 Global Health
 MEDLINE
 Rural Development Abstracts
 Tropical Diseases Bulletin

External links 
 

SAGE Publishing academic journals
English-language journals
HIV/AIDS journals
Publications established in 2002
Bimonthly journals
Academic journals associated with learned and professional societies